The Hewinson-Bell was an English automobile manufactured around 1900.  Six crude vehicles, apparently copied from Benzes, were built in the area of Southampton.

See also
 List of car manufacturers of the United Kingdom

References
David Burgess Wise, The New Illustrated Encyclopedia of Automobiles

Defunct motor vehicle manufacturers of England
Companies based in Hampshire